Parliamentary elections were held in Greece on 21 March 1868. Supporters of Alexandros Koumoundouros and Dimitrios Voulgaris won a majority of the 184 seats. Voulgaris remained Prime Minister, having assumed office on 6 February.

Results

References

Greece
Parliamentary elections in Greece
1868 in Greece
Greece
1860s in Greek politics